The CAC/PAC JF-17 Thunder, or FC-1 Xiaolong, is a lightweight, single-engine, multi-role combat aircraft developed jointly by the Chengdu Aircraft Corporation (CAC) of China and the Pakistan Aeronautical Complex (PAC). It was designed to replace the A-5C, F-7P/PG, Mirage III, and Mirage V combat aircraft in the Pakistan Air Force (PAF). The JF-17 can be used for multiple roles, including interception, ground attack, anti-ship, and aerial reconnaissance. The Pakistani designation "JF-17" stands for "Joint Fighter-17", with the "-17" denoting that, in the PAF's vision, it is the successor to the F-16. The Chinese designation "FC-1" stands for "Fighter China-1".

The JF-17 can deploy diverse ordnance, including air-to-air, air-to-surface, and anti-ship missiles, guided and unguided bombs, and a 23 mm GSh-23-2 twin-barrel autocannon. Powered by a Guizhou WS-13 or Klimov RD-93 afterburning turbofan, it has a top speed of Mach 1.6. The JF-17 is the backbone and workhorse of the PAF, complementing the Lockheed Martin F-16 Fighting Falcon at approximately half the cost, with the Block II variant costing $25 million. The JF-17 was inducted in the PAF in February 2010.

Fifty-eight per cent of the JF-17 airframe, including its front fuselage, wings, and vertical stabilizer, is produced in Pakistan, whereas forty-two percent is produced in China, with the final assembly and serial production taking place in Pakistan. In 2015, Pakistan produced 16 JF-17s. , PAC has the capacity to produce 20 JF-17s annually. By April 2017, PAC had manufactured 70 Block 1 aircraft and 33 Block 2 aircraft for the PAF. By 2016, PAF JF-17s had accumulated over 19,000 hours of operational flight. In 2017, PAC/CAC began developing a dual-seat variant known as the JF-17B for enhanced operational capability, conversion training, and lead-in fighter training. The JF-17B Block 2 variant went into serial production at PAC in 2018 and 26 aircraft were delivered to the PAF by December 2020. In December 2020, PAC began serial production of a more advanced Block 3 version of the aircraft with an active electronically scanned array (AESA) radar, a more powerful Russian Klimov RD-93MA engine, a larger and more advanced wide-angle Head-Up Display (HUD), electronic countermeasures, an additional hardpoint, and enhanced weapons capability. 

PAF JF-17s have seen military action, both air-to-air and air-to-ground, including bombing terrorist positions in North Waziristan near the Pakistan-Afghanistan border during anti-terror operations in 2014 and 2017 using both guided and unguided munitions, shooting down an intruding Iranian military drone near the Pakistan-Iran Border in Balochistan in 2017, and in Operation Swift Retort during the 2019 Jammu and Kashmir airstrikes and aerial skirmish between India and Pakistan.

Development

Background
The aircraft was also intended to have export potential as a cost-effective and competitive alternative to more expensive Western fighters. The development of this aircraft was headed by Yang Wei, who is considered China's "ace designer", who also designed the Chengdu J-20.

By 1989, because of economic sanctions by the US, Pakistan had abandoned Project Sabre II, a design study involving US aircraft manufacturer Grumman and China, and had decided to redesign and upgrade the Chengdu F-7. In the same year, China and Grumman started a new design study to develop the Super 7, another redesigned Chengdu F-7. Grumman left the project when sanctions were placed on China following the political fallout from the 1989 Tiananmen Square protests. After Grumman left the Chengdu Super 7 project, the Fighter China project was launched in 1991. In 1995, Pakistan and China signed a memorandum of understanding (MoU) for joint design and development of a new fighter, and over the next few years worked out the project details. In June 1995, Mikoyan had joined the project to provide "design support", this also involved the secondment of several engineers by CAC.

Launch of FC-1 project

In October 1995, Pakistan was reportedly to select a Western company by the end of the year to provide and integrate the FC-1's avionics, which was expected to go into production by 1999. The avionics were said to include radar, Inertial navigation system, Head-up display, and Multi-function displays. Competing bids came from Thomson-CSF with a variant of the Radar Doppler Multitarget (RDY), SAGEM with a similar avionics package to those used in the ROSE upgrade project, and Marconi Electronic Systems with its Blue Hawk radar. FIAR's (now SELEX Galileo) Grifo S7 radar was expected to be selected due to the company's ties with the PAF. In February 1998, Pakistan and China signed a letter of intent covering airframe development. Russia's Klimov offered a variant of the RD-33 turbofan engine to power the fighter. In April 1999, South Africa's Denel offered to arm the Super 7 with the T-darter beyond-visual-range (BVR) air-to-air missile (AAM), rather than the previously reported R-Darter. Previously in 1987, Pratt & Whitney offered the Super-7 project three engine options; PW1212, F404, and PW1216, with local manufacturing in either China or Pakistan. Rolls-Royce offered its RB199-127/128 turbofan engine; this plan was scrapped in 1989.

In June 1999, the contract to jointly develop and produce the Chengdu FC-1/Super 7 was signed. After GEC-Marconi had abandoned the bidding to supply an integrated avionics suite, FIAR and Thomson-CSF proposed a number of avionics suites based on the Grifo S7 and RC400 radars respectively, despite previously hoping to use the PAF's Super 7 to launch its new Blue Hawk radar. Because of sanctions placed on Pakistan after the country's 1998 nuclear weapons tests, design work progressed very slowly over the next 18 months, preventing delivery of the Western avionics to the PAF. In early 2001, the PAF decided to decouple the airframe from the avionics, enabling design work on the aircraft to continue. As the airframe was developed, any new avionics requirements by the PAF could be more easily integrated into the airframe.

Prototype production began in September 2002; a full-size mock-up of the FC-1/Super 7 was displayed at Airshow China in November 2002. The first batch of Klimov RD-93 turbofan engines that would power the prototypes was also delivered in 2002. According to a China National Aero-Technology Import & Export Corporation (CATIC) official, the JF-17's low cost is due to some of the on-board systems having been adapted from those of the Chengdu J-10. The official said, "This transfer of technologytransposing the aircraft systems from the J-10 to the JF-17is what makes the JF-17 so cost-effective". The use of computer-aided design software shortened the design phase of the JF-17.

Flight testing and redesigning
The first prototype, PT-01, was rolled out on 31 May 2003 and transferred to the Chengdu Flight Test Centre to be prepared for its maiden flight. This was initially planned to take place in June, but was delayed due to concerns about the SARS outbreak. The designation Super-7 was replaced by "JF-17" (Joint Fighter-17) around this point. Low speed taxiing trials began at Wenjiang Airport, Chengdu, on 27 June 2003. The maiden flight was made in late August 2003; an official maiden flight of the prototype took place in early September. The prototype was marked with the new PAF designation JF-17. By March 2004, CAC had made around 20 test flights of the first prototype. On 7 April 2004, PAF test pilots Rashid Habib and Mohammad Ehsan ul-Haq flew PT-01 for the first time. The maiden flight of the third prototype, PT-03, took place on 9 April 2004. In March 2004, Pakistan was planning to induct around 200 aircraft.

Following the third prototype, several design improvements were developed and incorporated into further aircraft. Because of excessive smoke emissions by the RD-93 engine, the air intakes were widened. Reported control problems found in testing resulted in alterations to the wing leading edge root extensions (LERX). The vertical tail fin was enlarged to house an expanded electronic warfare equipment bay in the tip. The redesigned aircraft had a slightly increased maximum take-off weight and incorporated an increased quantity of Chinese-sourced avionics; however PAF had selected Western avionics for their aircraft, postponing PAF deliveries from late 2005 until 2007. Pakistan evaluated British, French, and Italian avionics suites, the winner of which was expected to be finalised in 2006. PT-04, the fourth prototype and the first to incorporate the design changes, was rolled out in April 2006 and made its first flight on 28 April 2006.

The modified air intakes replaced conventional intake rampswhose function is to divert turbulent boundary layer airflow away from the inlet and prevent it entering the enginewith a diverterless supersonic inlet (DSI) design. The DSI uses a combination of forward-swept inlet cowls and a three-dimensional compression surface to divert the boundary layer airflow at high sub-sonic and supersonic speeds. According to Lockheed Martin, the DSI design prevents most of the boundary layer air from entering the engine at speeds up to two times the speed of sound, reduces weight by removing the need for complex mechanical intake mechanisms, and is stealthier than a conventional intake. In 1999, developmental work on the DSI with the aim of improving aircraft performance commenced. The JF-17 design was finalised in 2001. Multiple models underwent wind tunnel tests; it was found that the DSI reduced weight, cost, and complexity while improving performance.

For the avionics and weapons qualification phase of the flight testing, PT-04 was fitted with a fourth-generation avionics suite that incorporates sensor fusion, an electronic warfare suite, enhanced man-machine interface, Digital Electronic Engine Control (DEEC) for the RD-93 turbofan engine, FBW flight controls, day/night precision surface attack capability, and multi-mode, pulse-Doppler radar for BVR air-to-air attack capability. The sixth prototype, PT-06, made its maiden flight on 10 September 2006. Following a competition in 2008, Martin-Baker was selected over a Chinese firm for the supply of fifty PK16LE ejection seats.

Production

On 2 March 2007, the first consignment of two small-batch-production (SBP) aircraft arrived in a dismantled state in Pakistan. They flew for the first time on 10 March 2007 and took part in a public aerial demonstration during a Pakistan Day parade on 23 March 2007. The PAF intended to induct 200 JF-17 by 2015 to replace all its Chengdu F-7, Nanchang A-5, and Dassault Mirage III/5 aircraft. In preparation for the in-flight refuelling of JF-17s, the PAF has upgraded several Mirage IIIs with IFR probes for training purposes. A dual-seat, combat-capable trainer was originally scheduled to begin flight testing in 2006; in 2009 Pakistan reportedly decided to develop the training model into a specialised attack variant.

In November 2007, the PAF and PAC conducted flight evaluations of aircraft fitted with a variant of the NRIET KLJ-10 radar developed by China's Nanjing Research Institute for Electronic Technology (NRIET), and the LETRI SD-10 active radar homing AAM. In 2005, PAC began manufacturing JF-17 components; production of sub-assemblies commenced on 22 January 2008. The PAF was to receive a further six pre-production aircraft in 2005, for a total of 8 out of an initial production run of 16 aircraft. Initial operating capability was to be achieved by the end of 2008. Final assembly of the JF-17 in Pakistan began on 30 June 2009; PAC expected to complete production of four to six aircraft that year. They planned to produce twelve aircraft in 2010 and fifteen to sixteen aircraft per year from 2011; this could increase to twenty-five aircraft per year. On 29 December 2015, PAC announced the rollout of the 16th JF-17 Thunder fighter manufactured in the calendar year 2015, taking total number of manufactured aircraft to more than 66. Later, a PAF spokesperson said that in light of the interest shown by various countries, it has been decided that production capacity of JF-17 Thunder at PAC Kamra will be expanded.

Russia signed an agreement in August 2007 for re-export of 150 RD-93 engines from China to Pakistan for the JF-17. In 2008, the PAF reported it was not fully satisfied with the RD-93 engine and that it would only power the first 50 aircraft; it was alleged that arrangements for a new engine, reportedly the Snecma M53-P2, may have been made. Mikhail Pogosyan, head of the MiG and Sukhoi design bureaus, recommended the Russian defence export agency Rosoboronexport block RD-93 engine sales to China to prevent export competition from the JF-17 against the MiG-29. At the 2010 Farnborough Airshow, the JF-17 was displayed internationally for the first time; aerial displays at the show were intended but were cancelled due to a late attendance decision as well as license and insurance costs. According to a Rosoboronexport official at the Airshow China 2010, held on 16–21 November 2005 in Zhuhai, China, Russia and China had signed a contract worth $238 million for 100 RD-93 engines with options for another 400 engines developed for the FC-1.

According to media reports, Pakistan planned to increase production of JF-17s by 25% in 2016.

Further development

Pakistan negotiated with British and Italian defence firms regarding avionics and radars for the JF-17 development. Radar options include the Italian Galileo Avionica's Grifo S7, the French Thomson-CSF's RC400 (a variant of the RDY-2), and the British company SELEX Galileo's Vixen 500E AESA radar. In 2010, the PAF had reportedly selected ATE Aerospace Group to integrate French-built avionics and weapons systems over rival bids from Astrac, Finmeccanica and a Thales-Sagem joint venture. The RC-400 radar, MICA AAMs, and several air-to-surface weapons are believed to be in the contract. The PAF also held talks with South Africa for the supply of Denel A-darter AAMs.

In April 2010, after eighteen months of negotiations, the deal was reportedly suspended; reports cited French concerns about Pakistan's financial situation, the protection of sensitive French technology, and by Indian lobbying, which operates many French-built aircraft. France wanted the PAF to purchase several Mirage 2000-9 fighters from the United Arab Emirates Air Force, which would overlap with the upgraded JF-17. In July 2010, the PAF's Chief of Air Staff, Air Chief Marshal Rao Qamar Suleman, said such reports were false, stating: "I have had discussions with French Government officials who have assured me that this is not the position of their government...someone was trying to cause mischiefto put pressure on France not to supply the avionics we want".

On 18 December 2013, production of Block 2 JF-17s began at PAC's Kamra facility. These have an air-to-air refuelling capability, improved avionics, enhanced load carrying capacity, data link, and electronic warfare capabilities. Block 2 construction is planned to run until 2016, after which the manufacturing of further developed Block III aircraft is planned. In December 2015, it was announced that the 16th Block II aircraft had been handed over resulting in standing up of the 4th squadron.

On 17 June 2015, Jane's Defence Weekly confirmed that JF-17 Block III will have an AESA radar, a helmet-mounted display (HMD) and possibly an internal infrared search and tracking (IRST) system. A two-seat version was also reportedly be produced in Block III. Unconfirmed reports claim that Block III will also have a better flight management system. Selex ES has promoted its next-generation cockpit as a possible upgrade of JF-17 Block III; this cockpit includes a new mission computer, an enhanced head-up display and contemporary multi-function displays, plus the capability for the pilot to use a single, large-area display instead.

In July 2020, despite Indian protest Russian state-owned United Engine Corporation developed a new engine RD-93MA for JF-17 fighter being built by Pakistan.

Design

Airframe
The airframe is of semi-monocoque structure constructed primarily of aluminum alloys. High-strength steel and titanium alloys are partially adopted in some critical areas. The airframe is designed for a service life of 4,000 flight hours or 25 years, the first overhaul being due at 1,200 flight hours. Block 2 JF-17s incorporate greater use of composite materials in the airframe to reduce weight. The retractable undercarriage has a tricycle arrangement with a single steerable nose-wheel and two main undercarriages. The hydraulic brakes have an automatic anti-skid system. The position and shape of the inlets is designed to give the required airflow to the jet engine during maneuvers involving high angles of attack.

The mid-mounted wings are of cropped-delta configuration. Near the wing root are the LERX, which generate a vortex that provides extra lift to the wing at high angles of attack encountered during combat maneuvers. A conventional tri-plane empennage arrangement is incorporated, with all-moving stabilators, single vertical stabiliser, rudder, and twin ventral fins. The flight control system (FCS) comprises conventional controls with stability augmentation in the yaw and roll axis and a digital fly-by-wire (FBW) system in the pitch axis. The leading-edge slats/flaps and Trailing edge flaps are automatically adjusted during manoeuvring to increase turning performance. The FCS of serial production aircraft reportedly have a digital quadruplex (quad-redundant) FBW system in the pitch axis and a duplex (dual-redundant) FBW system in the roll and yaw axis.

Cockpit
The cockpit has very poor rear visibility, a trait of typical Soviet era design. It has three large Multifunction Colour Displays (MFD) and smart Heads-Up Display (HUD) with built-in symbol generation capability. A centre stick is used for pitch and roll control while rudder pedals control yaw. A throttle is located to the left of the pilot. The cockpit incorporates hands-on-throttle-and-stick (HOTAS) controls. The pilot sits on a Martin-Baker Mk-16LE zero-zero ejection seat. The cockpit incorporates an electronic flight instrument system (EFIS) and a wide-angle, holographic head-up display (HUD), which has a minimum total field of view of 25 degrees. The EFIS comprises three colour multi-function displays, providing basic flight information, tactical information, and information on the engine, fuel, electrical, hydraulics, flight control, and environment control systems. The HUD and MFD can be configured to show any available information. The central MFD is placed lowest to accommodate a control panel between it and the HUD.

Avionics
The avionics software incorporates the concept of open architecture. Instead of the military-optimised Ada programming language, the software is written using the popular C++ programming language, enabling the use of the numerous civilian programmers available. The aircraft also includes a health and usage monitoring system, and automatic test equipment.

The JF-17 has a defensive aids system (DAS) composed of various integrated sub-systems. A radar warning receiver (RWR) provides data such as direction and proximity of enemy radars, and an electronic warfare (EW) suite housed in a fairing at the tip of the tail fin interferes with enemy radars. The EW suite is also linked to a Missile Approach Warning (MAW) system to defend against radar-guided missiles. The MAW system uses several optical sensors across the airframe to detect the rocket motors of missiles across a 360-degree coverage. Data from the MAW system, such as direction of inbound missiles and the time to impact, is shown on cockpit displays and the HUD. A countermeasures dispensing system releases decoy flares and chaff to help evade hostile radar and missiles. The DAS systems will also be enhanced by integration of a self-protection radar-jamming pod that will be carried externally on a hardpoint.

The first forty-two PAF production aircraft are equipped with the NRIET KLJ-7 radar, a variant of the KLJ-10 radar developed by China's Nanjing Research Institute of Electronic Technology (NRIET) and also used on the Chengdu J-10. Multiple modes can manage the surveillance and engagement of up to forty air, ground, and sea targets; the track-while-scan mode can track up to ten targets at BVR and can engage two simultaneously with radar-homing AAMs. A forward looking infrared (FLIR) pod for low-level navigation and infra-red search and track (IRST) system for passive targeting can also be integrated; the JF-17 Block 2 is believed to incorporate an IRST. In April 2016, Air Marshal Muhammad Ashfaque Arain said that, "JF-17 needs a targeting pod, as the jets' usefulness in current operations was limited due to lack of precision targeting. To fulfill this gap the Air Force was interested in buying the Thales-made Damocles, a third-generation targeting pod; which was a priority." In 2017, Aselsans ASELPOD was tested and successfully integrated with the JF-17 and Pakistan has subsequently purchased at least eight targeting pods from Aselsan. This integration has significantly enhanced the JF-17 platform's ability to launch precision strikes.

A helmet-mounted sight (HMS) developed by Luoyang Electro-Optics Technology Development Centre of AVIC was developed in parallel with the JF-17; it was first tested on Prototype 04 in 2006. It was dubbed as EO HMS, (Electro-Optical Helmet Mounted Sight) and was first revealed to the public in 2008 at the 7th Zhuhai Airshow, where a partial mock-up was on display. The HMS tracks the pilot's head and eye movements to guide missiles towards the pilot's visual target. An externally carried day/night laser designator targeting pod may be integrated with the avionics to guide laser-guided bombs (LGBs). An extra hardpoint may be added under the starboard air intake, opposite the cannon, for such pods. To reduce the numbers of targeting pods required, the aircraft's tactical data link can transmit target data to other aircraft not equipped with targeting pods. The communication systems comprise two VHF/UHF radios; the VHF radio has the capacity for data linking for communication with ground control centers, airborne early warning and control aircraft and combat aircraft with compatible data links for network-centric warfare, and improved situation awareness. The aircraft uses RLGs along with GPS for navigation. The aircraft is equipped with an IFF Transponder which allows it to differentiate between friendly aircraft and enemy aircraft. The ACMI aids in aerial combat for maneuvering.

Engine
The first two blocks of JF-17 is powered by a single Russian RD-93 turbofan engine, which is a variant of the Klimov RD-33 engine used on the MiG-29 fighter. The engine gives more thrust and significantly lower specific fuel consumption than turbojet engines fitted to older combat aircraft being replaced by the JF-17. The advantages of using a single engine are a reduction in maintenance time and cost when compared to twin-engined fighters. A thrust-to-weight ratio of 0.99 can be achieved with full internal fuel tanks and no external payload. The engine's air supply is provided by two bifurcated air inlets (see airframe section).

The RD-93 is known to produce smoke trails. The Guizhou Aero Engine Group has been developing a new turbofan engine, the WS-13 Taishan, since 2000 to replace the RD-93. It is based on the RD-33 and incorporates new technologies to boost performance and reliability. During the 2015 Paris Air Show, it was announced that flight testing of a JF-17 equipped with the WS-13 engine had begun. In 2015, a representative of PAC said that Pakistan would continue to use the RD-93 engine on their fighters. Local media reports in January 2016 said that Russia was planning to sell engines for JF-17 directly to Pakistan. According to a PAC representative, Pakistan is looking to collaborate with Russia in developing and repairing engines.

Fuel system
Internal fuel storage can be supplemented by external fuel tanks. One  drop tank can be mounted on the aircraft's centerline hard point under the fuselage and two 800-litre or  drop tanks can be mounted on the two inboard under-wing hardpoints. The fuel system is compatible with in-flight refueling (IFR), allowing tanker aircraft to refuel inflight, and increasing its range and loitering time significantly. All production aircraft for the PAF are to be fitted with IFR probes. In June 2013, PAF Air Chief Marshal Tahir Rafique Butt said ground tests on the JF-17's refueling probes had been successfully completed and the first mid-air refuelling operations would commence that summer.

Armaments

One hardpoint is located under the fuselage between the main landing gear, two are underneath each wing, and one is at each wing-tip. All seven hardpoints communicate via a MIL-STD-1760 data-bus architecture with the Stores Management System, which is stated to be capable of integration with weaponry of any origin. Internal armament comprises one  GSh-23-2 twin-barrel cannon mounted under the port side air intake, which can be replaced with a  GSh-30-2 twin-barrel cannon.

The wing-tip hard-points are typically occupied by short range infra-red homing AAMs. Many combinations of ordnance and equipment such as targeting pods can be carried on the under-wing and under-fuselage hard-points. Underwing hard-points can be fitted with multiple ejector racks, allowing each hard-point to carry two  unguided bombs or LGBsMk.82 or GBU-12. It is unknown whether multiple ejector racks can be used for ordnance such as beyond visual range (BVR) AAMs. Active radar homing BVR AAMs can be integrated with the radar and data-link for mid-course updates. The Chinese PL-12/SD-10 is expected to be the aircraft's primary BVR air-to-air weapon, although this may change if radars of other origin are fitted. Short range, infra-red homing missiles include the Chinese PL-5E and PL-9C. The PAF is also seeking to arm the JF-17 with a fifth generation close-combat missile such as the PL10E IRIS-T or A-Darter. These will be integrated with the HMS/D and the radar for targeting.

Unguided air-to-ground weaponry includes rocket pods, gravity bombs and Matra Durandal anti-runway munitions. Precision-guided munitions such as LGBs and satellite-guided bombs are also compatible with the JF-17, as are other guided weapons such as anti-ship missiles and anti-radiation missiles. Pakistan planned to bring the Brazilian MAR-1 anti-radiation missile into service on its JF-17 fleet in 2014.

Operational history

Pakistan

Small batch production of the single-seat, single-engine JF-17s began in China in June 2006. The first two small-batch-produced aircraft were delivered on 2 March 2007 and first flew in Pakistan on 10 March. They took part in an aerial display on 23 March 2007 as part of the Pakistan Day Joint Services Parade in Islamabad. Another six small-batch-produced aircraft were delivered by March 2008. These were extensively flight-tested and evaluated by the PAF. Two serial production aircraft were delivered from China in 2009 and the first Pakistani-manufactured aircraft was delivered to the PAF in a ceremony on 23 November 2009.

On 18 February 2010, the first JF-17 squadron, No. 26 Black Spiders, was officially inducted into the PAF with an initial strength of 14 fighter planes. These aircraft first saw service in the anti-terrorist operation in South Waziristan, during which various types of weapons were evaluated. They took part in the PAF's High Mark 2010 exercise from 29 April, where they were used by the Blue Force to attack Red Land surface targets with precision air-to-surface weapons.

On 11 April 2011, a re-equipment ceremony for No. 26 Black Spiders Squadron took place, during which it was stated that the JF-17 had "revolutionized the PAF's operational concepts". Then Air Chief Marshal Rao Qamar Suleman reported the re-equipping of No. 26 squadron and the addition of the JF-17 Thunder to the No. 16 Squadron. He also thanked the contribution and support of the Chinese in helping to acquire a technological breakthrough in the shape of the aircraft.

As of September 2015, the No. 2 Squadron currently tasked with sea strikes was reequipped with JF-17s replacing the F7s. The No. 16 Squadron "Black Panthers" has also been equipped with the JF-17. The next squadron is supposed to be No. 7 Squadron.

On 19 June 2017, it was reported that a JF-17 shot down an Iranian UAV operating in Pakistan's Pangjur District.

In February 2019, PAF JF-17s took part in Pakistan's retaliatory airstrikes during which two Thunders of the No. 16 Squadron struck Indian ground targets with Mk. 83 REKs. According to unconfirmed reports, an IAF MiG-21 was also shot down by a JF-17.

As of March 2021, JF-17s are operational in seven fighter squadrons based at five airbases.

JF-17 has performed at airshows since 2010. PAF JF-17s have taken part in joint exercises with the Chinese air force since at least 2014. In 2021, PAF JF-17s exercised in Anatolian Eagle (alongside Azerbaijani MiG-29s and Su-25s, Qatari Rafales, and Turkish F-16s). In 2022, PAF JF-17s exercised at "Spears of Victory" at King Abdulaziz Air Base, Saudi Arabia (alongside Saudi Tornados, Typhoons and F-15s, and USAF F-16s).

Myanmar

In July 2015, Myanmar ordered 16 JF-17s from Pakistan and China. In late 2015, Myanmar ordered 16 RD-93 spare engines from Russia, which were received in 2018 and 2019.  On 17 December 2018, Jane's disclosed that the Myanmar Air Force had received the first batch of JF-17Ms. An official Myanmar Air Force video released on Air Force day showcased a number of JF-17s, both on static display and in the air. Till date, the Myanmar Air Force has taken delivery of 7 JF-17M Block 2s - 5 JF-17As and 2 JF-17Bs.

Nigeria
In December 2014, during the International Defence Exhibition and Seminar in Karachi, Nigeria was reportedly buying between 25 and 40 JF-17s from Pakistan. Nigerian Air Force (NAF) chief Air Marshal Adesola Nunayon Amosu had visited Pakistan earlier in October 2014. Nigeria became the second customer in 2016 by placing an order for three planes. However, as the news reports value the deal at US$25 million, it is not clear if the item is misreported. A June 2016 article in Jane's re-affirmed NAF budget for 3 JF-17, 10 Super Mushshak, and 2 Mi-35M aircraft in 2016. According to Indian media, a deal to buy JF-17s might be signed in November with a MoU already signed.

The Nigerian Air Force has confirmed it is expecting delivery of JF-17 for use in military operations against Jihadi militants in Northern Nigeria.

In October 2018 Pakistan approved of the sale and local Nigerian production of three JF-17s for US$184.3 million. The aircraft are rumored to be of a later version than the initially agreed sale, providing more advanced systems.

On 30 December 2020, the PAC rolled out three JF-17A Block 2s for NAF, which were delivered to Makurdi Air Base in Nigeria in March 2021 aboard PAF Illyushin Il-78MP freighters. Nigeria formally inducted the three JF-17s into its air force on 21 May 2021.

NAF may order 35-40 more JF-17s if the aircraft meets its requirements.

Potential operators

Argentina  At the 2013 Paris Air Show, officials from Argentine aerospace conglomerate Fábrica Argentina de Aviones (FAdeA) revealed that the firm had held multiple discussions with Chinese officials over a potential co-production of the FC-1/JF-17, for the Argentine Air Force (FAA); this was regarded as the first formal effort by Argentina to possibly procure, or co-produce the aircraft. FAdeA officials said that the co-produced FC-1 could be classified as the "Pulqui-III", with regard to FAdeA's Pulqui-II fighter.

In 2015, following a three-day visit by Argentine president Cristina Fernández de Kirchner to China, Argentina announced that it may purchase around 20 JF-17's from CAIG; however Argentina did not purchase the fighter that year.

The JF-17 has reportedly appeared to be highly appealing to Argentina, given the aircraft's high-affordability and fewer parts of British-origin; the UK has barred any sale of military-equipment consisting of UK-manufactured parts to Argentina, ever since the British-Argentine 1982 Falklands War. Argentina's earlier efforts to procure other aircraft, including the Mirage F1M, the IAI Kfir, the JAS 39 Gripen and the KAI FA-50 were scuttled due to UK-diplomatic pressure, since the aforementioned aircraft were found to contain UK-origin parts. However, the JF-17 may still be subject to UK-scrutiny, since it utilizes the British-origin Martin-Baker PK16LE ejection seat; however, China has reportedly offered the Chinese-origin HTY-5D ejection seat (used on the Chengdu J-10), as a possible diplomatic alternative to the PK16LE.

In September 2021, the Argentine government presented a draft budget for the fiscal year of 2022, which contained a request of USD $664 million for the acquisition of future fighter aircraft for the FAA. However, multiple media outlets misinterpreted this action, erroneously reporting that the request for funds were for acquiring the JF-17 Block-III; this misinterpreted news would later become viral on social media. Argentina's Ministry of Defense (Ministerio de Defensa) later clarified that the JF-17 had not been selected, asserting that the FAA was still evaluating five other aircraft as possible options.

In December 2021, the Pakistani embassy in Argentina released a cryptic post on Instagram, claiming that Pakistan "may lose out" on selling JF-17's to Argentina; the embassy later asserted that its Instagram account had been hacked and that the cryptic message was not an official release. The message has since then been deleted.

In May 2022, the Argentine Air Force delegation evaluated the JF-17 Thunder in China, only the JF-17 and the Danish second-hand F-16 remain in the final stretch. The visit of the Argentine delegation to the CATIC (China National Aero-Technology Import & Export Corporation) facilities, located in Chengdu.

Azerbaijan  In January 2008, Azerbaijan engaged in talks with Pakistan over JF-17's possible sale to Azerbaijan. In 2015, the Azerbaijani Air Forces negotiated with China for several dozen JF-17s worth approximately  each. In 2018, Pakistani Armed Forces actively discussed military and defence cooperation with Azerbaijan, culminating in the latter expressing an interest in purchasing the JF-17 Thunder fighter jet. In December 2018, Turan, an independent Azerbaijani news agency, reported that the negotiations between Azerbaijan and Pakistan on the purchase of JF-17 Block II combat aircraft was coming to the end. In December 2019, Azerbaijan, eyeing military cooperation with Pakistan, expressed its interest in purchasing JF-17 Thunder fighter bomber aircraft.
Bolivia  The JF-17 is a candidate for the replacement of retired Lockheed T-33 aircraft of the Bolivian Air Force.

Iraq  In September 2021, Pakistani media reported that Iraq has placed an order for 12 JF-17s, In a television interview aired by Al-Arabiya on 30 January 2022, Iraq's Defence Minister, Juma Inad, hinted at the acquisition of an unspecified military aircraft from Pakistan. He did not specify the type or quantity of aircraft to be purchased.

Malaysia  Malaysia had periodically indicated that it may be interested in purchasing the JF-17 for the Royal Malaysian Air Force (RMAF), as part of its efforts to replace its MIG-29 fleet; reports of Malaysian interest in the JF-17 emerged in 2015, although this was later denied.
In March 2019, then-visiting Malaysian PM Mahathir bin Mohammad was accorded an aerial-display of the JF-17's at the 2019 Pakistan Day Parade; he was also briefed about the fighter by the Pakistan Air Force (PAF). Concurrently, multiple reports of Malaysia possibly procuring two JF-17 fighters for testing and combat-evaluation also emerged, though these reports have ever since remained unconfirmed. 

In June 2021, the RMAF formally released a tender for the supply of 18 light combat-aircraft — dubbed as the "Fighter Lead In Trainer-Light Combat Aircraft" (FLIT/LCA), in an effort to supplant its ageing BAE Hawk 108/208 light-combat aircraft and its MB-339CM trainer-aircraft. The RMAF later issued a Request for Proposal (RFP) to nine different aircraft-manufacturing conglomerates in July, with a submission-deadline of September 2021 (this would later be extended to October 2021). The JF-17 was widely regarded to be a leading contender in the FLIT/LCA procurement initiative, along with the HAL Tejas and the KAI FA-50. 

However, in October 2021, the JF-17 was revealed to have abstained from participating in the FLIT/LCA tender; later reports confirmed that only six companies had responded to the RFP issued by the RMAF - the KAI FA-50 (Korea Aerospace Industries), the HAL Tejas (Hindustan Aeronautics Limited), the HAIC L-15 (China National Aero-Technology Import & Export Corporation), the Aermacchi M-346 (Leonardo S.p.A.), the TAI Hürjet (Turkish Aerospace Industries) and the Mikoyan MiG-35 (Rosoboronexport). The JF-17's unprecedented absence from the FLIT/LCA essentially ended all speculations regarding its participation in Malaysia.

In December 2021, the JF-17 was reportedly re-offered to the RMAF, with an estimated price-discount of about 30%; however, these reports remain unconfirmed.

Morocco  Morocco has shown interest in the JF-17, having invited a sales team to showcase it in the Marrakech Air Show 2016. According to a local analyst, a potential acquisition by Morocco may be complicated by incompatible technologies; the JF-17 Block I and Block II have broadly different electronics suites and air-to-air & air-to-surface munitions than its current Western-sourced aircraft, such as the Mirage F-1 (MF2000), F-5E/F Tiger II and Alpha Jet.
Qatar  Qatar has shown interest in the JF-17 since 2016. In December 2019, at Qatar's invitation, PAF JF-17s participated in Qatar's National Day Flypast in Doha alongside Qatar Air Force Rafales and Mirage 2000-5s.
Saudi Arabia  In January 2014, the Royal Saudi Air Force was reportedly examining potential technology transfer and co-production opportunities for the JF-17. Saudi Deputy Minister of Defence Prince Salman bin Sultan toured the JF-17 project during a visit to Pakistan.
Sri Lanka  In June 2015, Pakistani media suggested that an export order had been confirmed with the Sri Lanka Air Force; claims were made that the JF-17's first sales contract had been signed with the Sri Lanka Air Force at the 51st Paris Air Show. Other sources claimed that Myanmar is the first buyer of Pakistani JF-17s. Reportedly, the order would cover around 18–24 aircraft and deliveries set to begin in 2017. During a state visit by Nawaz Sharif in January 2016, Sri Lanka reportedly signed an agreement to buy eight JF-17s from Pakistan; however, the Sri Lankan government has issued denials. The alleged deal was said to involve 10–12 aircraft, each valued at US$35 million, for a total of US$400 million Reportedly, any such sale was scuppered by Indian diplomatic pressure.
Sudan  The Sudanese Air Force was reportedly negotiating to buy twelve aircraft.
Zimbabwe  The Air Force of Zimbabwe reportedly planned to purchase twelve JF-17s in 2004, as part of a $240 million deal with China. No such sales have materialized. In 2010, China was reportedly in talks about the JF-17 with five or six countries, some of which had sent pilots to China to undergo test flights.
Other countries  Other countries including Bangladesh, Bulgaria, Egypt, Jordan, Kuwait, Peru, South Africa, Uruguay, and Venezuela have shown interest in the JF-17.

Variants

Prototypes

PT-01  First airframe configuration prototype with splitter plates on intakes. Rolled out on 31 May 2003. First flight on 25 August 2003.
PT-02  First airframe configuration prototype with splitter plates on intakes.
PT-03  First airframe configuration prototype with splitter plates on intakes. First flight in April 2004. 
PT-04  Second airframe configuration prototype with Diverterless Supersonic Inlets (DSI) and modified vertical stabilizer. First flight on 10 May 2006. PT-04 incorporated modifications such as DSI, wider LERX, extended ventral fins, and a taller, less swept vertical stabilizer with a rectangular fairing at the tip containing electronic warfare equipment and small blister fairings at the base containing Missile Approach Warning sensors. The PT-04 prototype was primarily used for avionics and weapon qualification tests.
PT-05  Second airframe configuration prototype with DSI and modified vertical stabilizer. 
PT-06  Second airframe configuration prototype with DSI and modified vertical stabilizer.

Production variants
In chronological production order:

JF-17A Block 1  Single-seat variant of the JF-17 Block 1. Production in China began in June 2006 and in Pakistan in 2007. The first three Chinese weapons to be integrated are the PL-5E II AAM, the SD-10 AAM, and the C-802AK anti-ship missile. Block 1 aircraft had performed "better than expected" according to PAF Air Commodore Junaid. Production of Block 1 was completed on 18 December when the fiftieth aircraft58% of which was produced in Pakistanwas delivered. A Block 1 JF-17 costs approximately US$15 million per unit.
JF-17A Block 2  Single-seat variant of the JF-17 Block 2. Production began on 18 December 2013 and initial testing began on 9 February 2015. Block 2 aircraft make use of composites in the airframe for reduced weight, air-to-air refuelling capability, improved radar and avionics, enhanced load carrying capacity, data link, and electronic warfare capabilities. Chairman of PAC, Air Marshal Javaid Ahmed said: "We will hand over 16 Block-II JF-17s to the PAF every year", and that the manufacturing plant has the capacity to produce 25 units in a year. According to local media, PAC rolled out the 16th Block 2 aircraft in December 2015 enabling the JF-17's 4th squadron formation. A Block 2 JF-17 costs approximately US$25 million per unit.
JF-17B Block 2  Dual-seat variant of the JF-17 Block 2. First flight in Chengdu, China on 27 April 2017. Serial production in China and Pakistan from 2018 to 2020. A total of 26 aircraft built - first four at Chengdu and remaining 22 at Kamra. Its multi-roles include use as a (i) JF-17 conversion trainer; (ii) Lead-In Fighter Trainer (LIFT); (iii) ground-attack aircraft; and (iv) reconnaissance aircraft. Apart from the dual-seat, larger dorsal spine, and a more swept-back tail, another difference between the JF-17B and the JF-17A is that the JF-17B carries fuel in its vertical stabilizer, which the JF-17A does not. The JF-17B houses integral fuel tanks like the F-16. Each wing houses 550 Ib while the vertical tail houses 210 lb, which, together with the internal fuel load, totals 4,910 Ib of fuel. Together with the three external fuel drop-tanks, the aircraft can carry a total 10,000 Ib fuel load. The JF-17B Block 2s will be retrofitted with the NRIET/CETC KLJ-7A Air-cooled Airborne Fire-Control Active Electronically Scanned Array (AESA) radar (license-manufactured at the Avionics Production Factory (APF) at PAC, Kamra).
JF-17C Block 3   Single-seat variant of the JF-17 Block 3. First flight in Chengdu, China on 15 December 2019. Two prototypes underwent flight tests as of December 2020, one in China and the other in Pakistan. Went into serial production at PAC Kamra on 30 December 2020. Projected to feature further advancements such as a NRIET/CETC KLJ-7A Air-cooled Airborne Fire-Control Active Electronically Scanned Array (AESA) radar (license-manufactured at the Avionics Production Factory (APF) at PAC, Kamra), a three-axis digital fly-by-wire flight control system, an infrared search and track (IRST) system, a helmet-mounted display and sight (HMD/S) system produced jointly by Pakistan and China, a missile approach warning system (MAWS) similar to the one used on the Chinese J-10C, J-16, and J-20, a new, larger, and thinner holographic wide-angle head-up display (HUD) similar to the one used on the J-10C and J-20, an enhanced electronic warfare management system, a chin-mounted hardpoint, use of more composites for further weight reduction, Klimov RD-93MA afterburning turbofan will be eventually replaced by Guizhou WS-13 with an increased thrust, and a better thrust-to-weight ratio. The KLJ-7A can simultaneously track 15 targets and engage 4 targets. PAF officials have described the JF-17 Block 3 as a "fourth generation plus" fighter jet. The first PAC-produced JF-17 Block 3 aircraft are expected to roll out of the production line in late 2021. The PAF has placed an order for 50 JF-17 Block 3 aircraft, deliveries of which are expected to start from early 2022. 10 JF-17 Block 3 production aircraft were photographed after their rollout at PAC Kamra in early January 2022. As of March 2023, there has been no confirmation that JF-17Cs have been inducted into the PAF.

Operators

 Myanmar Air Force: 7 delivered, 9 on order
 Meiktila Air Base

 Nigerian Air Force: 3 delivered
 NAF Base Makurdi

 Pakistan Air Force: 138 delivered, 50 on order
PAF Base Masroor (Karachi)
 No. 2 Squadron Minhasians (2015)
 PAF Base Minhas (Kamra)
 JF-17 TEF (Test & Evaluation Flight) (2007–2010)
 No.14 Squadron Tail Choppers (2017)
 No. 16 Squadron Black Panthers (2011)
 No. 18 Squadron Sharp Shooters (JF-17 OCU) (2020)
PAF Base Mushaf (Sargodha)
 CCS JF-17 Squadron Fierce Dragons (2015)
 PAF Base Peshawar
 No. 26 Squadron Black Spiders (2010)
PAF Base Samungli (Quetta)
 No. 28 Squadron Phoenix (2018)

Accidents 

Since its introduction in 2007, four JF-17s have crashed in accidents:

 14 November 2011: A PAF JF-17A crashed during a routine training flight in the mountainous Mullan Mansoor region of Attock District while flying from PAF Base Minhas. According to the official PAF report, the crash was caused by a technical malfunction. Pakistani news reported that the pilot, Squadron Leader Muhammad Hussain, ejected but was killed after his parachute failed to open, and that there were no civilian casualties reported on the ground. The pilot's body was discovered two kilometers from the crash site.  This was the first known crash of a JF-17.
 27 September 2016: A PAF JF-17A crashed during Exercise High Mark in the Arabian Sea. The pilot ejected successfully and was rescued from the sea. Martin-Baker, the manufacturer of the JF-17's ejection seats, later tweeted that the 15 September 2020 crash was the first ejection from a JF-17.
 15 September 2020: A PAF JF-17A crashed during a routine training flight near Pindigheb, Attock District. The pilot ejected successfully and no loss of life was reported on the ground. While the PAF did not identify the aircraft, ejection seat manufacturer Martin-Baker, whose seats are installed in the JF-17, said in a Twitter post, "a Pakistan Air Force JF-17 aircraft crashed earlier today during a routine training mission, the pilot ejected successfully," adding that this marked the first instance of an ejection from a JF-17 aircraft, which uses its Martin-Baker PK16LE ejection seats, contradicting Pakistani reports of prior ejections.
 6 August 2021: A PAF JF-17B crashed during a routine training flight in Attock District. Both pilots ejected successfully and no loss of life was reported on the ground.

Specifications (JF-17 Block 3)

See also

References

Citations

Bibliography
 Medeiros, Evan S., Roger Cliff, Keith Crane and James C. Mulvenon. A New Direction for China's Defense Industry. Rand Corporation, 2005. .

External links

 Archived Factsheet FC-1 on Chengdu Aircraft Industry Corporation (CAC) website
 Factsheet JF-17 on Pakistan Aeronautical Complex (PAC) website

Science and technology in Pakistan
JF-017
JF-017
2000s international fighter aircraft
Single-engined jet aircraft
China–Pakistan military relations
Mid-wing aircraft
Aircraft first flown in 2003
Supersonic aircraft
Fourth-generation jet fighter